Ngong Ping is a highland in the western part of Lantau Island, Hong Kong. It hosts Po Lin Monastery and Tian Tan Buddha amidst the hills which is about 34 m tall. There are several hills nearby which are also an attraction to tourists. It is now the terminus of the cable car ride Ngong Ping 360 which travels to Tung Chung. New facilities and tourist attractions have opened including the Ngong Ping Village, Walking with the Buddha, the Monkey's Tale Theatre and Ngong Ping Tea House. A youth hostel is located near the monastery. The second highest peak of Hong Kong, Lantau Peak, is at its southeast.

Administration
Ngong Ping Wan is a recognized village under the New Territories Small House Policy.

Tourism projects
In 2002, the Hong Kong government announced that the MTR Corporation (MTRC) had secured the rights to run a cable car which formed part of a HK$750 million tourism project scheduled for completion in August 2005. Under the plan, a theme village would be built at Ngong Ping along a 'tourist corridor', with 6,000 square metres of shop space and an 18,600-square-metre piazza between the cable car terminal and the Po Lin Monastery. A 5.5km cable car line, jointly managed by the MTRC and Skyrail-ITM of Australia, would link it to Tung Chung station, in the vicinity of Hong Kong International Airport. Government-funded infrastructure works were estimated to cost $70 million. 

The MTRC were granted the rights to develop and run businesses within the tourist corridor, which religious groups feared could destroy the area's religious environment, and threaten the closure of the Po Lin Monastery by draining their revenues. Environmental groups also expressed concerns about the project: the Conservancy Association feared the project would endanger woodland and brooks nearby, by threatening butterfly-habitat. The government, however, said it had considered the views of religious and green groups, and reassured that the design would "preserve the tranquil atmosphere." The Travel Industry Council welcomed the "long overdue" project; the MTRC said the project would create 300 jobs. 

Facilities and tourist attractions opened in 2005 include the Ngong Ping Village, Walking with the Buddha, A tale of monkey's theatre and Ngong Ping tea house.

Entertainments
The press conference of Ultimate Song Chart Awards Presentation was held in Ngong Ping Village in November 2021 and 2022

See also
List of areas of Hong Kong

References

External link

 Delineation of area of existing village Ngong Ping (Tai O) for election of resident representative (2019 to 2022)
 International Cable Car Gallery at Ngong Ping

 
Plateaus of China